The Army Black Knights are the athletic teams that represent the United States Military Academy, located in West Point, New York. In sports, the teams are commonly referred to as Army. The Black Knights compete at the National Collegiate Athletic Association (NCAA) Division I level as a non-football member of the Patriot League, a Division I Football Bowl Subdivision independent school and a member of Atlantic Hockey, the Collegiate Sprint Football League (men), the Eastern Intercollegiate Gymnastics League (men), the Eastern Intercollegiate Wrestling Association, the Great America Rifle Conference, the National Collegiate Boxing Association, the National Collegiate Paintball Association and the National Intercollegiate Women's Fencing Association. Army is also one of approximately 300 members of the Eastern College Athletic Conference (ECAC).

Three of the service academies (Army, Air Force, and Navy) compete for the Commander-in-Chief's Trophy, which is awarded to the academy that defeats the others in football that year or is retained by the prior year's winner in the event of a three-way tie.

History
Since 1899, Army's mascot has officially been a mule because of the animal's historical importance in military operations. For many years, Army's teams were known as the "Cadets." The academy's football team was nicknamed "The Black Knights of the Hudson" due to the black color of its uniforms. In 1999, Army adopted "Black Knights" as its official nickname in all sports. They may also use "Cadets" in certain circumstances.

U.S. sports media use Army as a synonym for the academy. In 2015, the academy adopted this usage formally, referring to its sports programs as Army West Point.

"On Brave Old Army Team", by Philip Egner, is the school's fight song. Army's chief sports rival is the Naval Academy, due to its long-standing football rivalry and the inter-service rivalry with the Navy in general. Fourth class cadets verbally greet upper-class cadets and faculty with "Beat Navy", while the tunnel that runs under Washington Road is named the "Beat Navy" tunnel. In the first half of the 20th century, Army and Notre Dame were football rivals, but that rivalry has since died out.

Athletic programs

Football 

The Army Black Knights football program are one of the few NCAA Division I Football Bowl Subdivision independent schools (not in a conference). Army was recognized as the national champions in 1944, 1945 and 1946. The annual Army-Navy Game between the Black Knights of Army and the Midshipmen of the Naval Academy at Annapolis (Navy) is among the most storied rivalries in all of college sports and currently marks the end of regular season play for college football each year.

Men's golf
The men's golf team has won 21 conference championships:
Metro Atlantic Athletic Conference (9): 1982–88, 1989 (spring), 1989 (fall)
Patriot League (11): 1991–93, 1994 (spring), 1994 (fall), 1995, 2002, 2004–05, 2011, 2016, 2019

Men's ice hockey 

Every year, Army faces the Royal Military College of Canada (RMC) Paladins in the annual West Point Weekend hockey game. This series, conceived in 1923, is the longest-running annual international sporting event in the world.

Men's rugby 

Army rugby plays college rugby in the Division 1–A Eastern Conference. The Black Knights play their home games at the Anderson Rugby Complex on the campus of West Point. Rugby is a relatively popular sport at Army; for example, the 2012 game against Air Force was attended by 2,000 fans. Army is led by Director of Rugby Matt Sherman.

Army has one of the most successful college rugby teams in the country.  Army played in three consecutive national championship games from 1990–1992 and reached the national semi-finals four consecutive years from 2000–2003, twice in a row in 2009 and 2010.  More recently, Army reached the quarterfinals in 2013. Army also plays in the Collegiate Rugby Championship for rugby sevens, the highest profile college rugby tournament in the U.S., reaching the finals in 2011. The Collegiate Rugby Championship had been played every year in early June near Philadelphia and was broadcast live on NBC. It has been played in New Orleans since 2021.

Men's soccer

Army won the Division 1-A rugby national championship in XVs in 2022, defeating St. Mary’s of California, 20-8. The team defeated three perennial powerhouses in a row by earlier defeating both Life University and Lindenwood University in the tournament.

Wrestling
The Army Black Knights Wrestling team host home dual meets, tournaments, workout, and practice in the state of the art facility Arvin Gymnasium on campus. The team currently competes in the Eastern Intercollegiate Wrestling Association (EIWA) since Army is a member of the non-wrestling Patriot League.

In 2014, Kevin Ward, a former Oklahoma State All-American, took over the program. Ward is best known for starting the Ouachita Baptist University wrestling program in 2010, the first NCAA wrestling program in Arkansas.

Non-varsity sports

Boxing 
In intercollegiate competition, both the men's and women's boxing teams compete in the National Collegiate Boxing Association, though the women's team was part of the United States Intercollegiate Boxing Association from 2013 until 2015. The men's team won the national NCBA tournament from 2008-2011, from 2013-2014, and from 2016-2019; the women's team won the first-ever USIBA women's championship in 2013 (also the very first national collegiate women's boxing tournament in the U.S.), won again in 2014, and won the NCBA championship in 2017 and 2018.

Handball

The Army handball team has at least 31 men and 18 women National Championship titles.

Awards
 Lt. Raymond Enners Award (national men's lacrosse award; named for a member of the Class of 1967)
 Maggie Dixon Award (national women's basketball rookie coach award; named for Army women's basketball coach)
 NCAA Award of Valor:
 2007 — Derek Hines (Class of 2003), who demonstrated valor in Afghanistan before being killed there.
 2008 — Emily Perez (Class of 2005), who died after an improvised explosive device exploded near her vehicle in Iraq and whose U.S. Army unit recognized her for her leadership after her death.
 NCAA Theodore Roosevelt Award:
 1967 — Dwight D. Eisenhower (football)
 1973 — Omar Bradley (baseball)

Hall of Fame
For a list of members by name, sport, class year, or induction year, see footnote
The Army Sports Hall of Fame consists of displays in the Kenna Hall of Army Sports, which is located within the Kimsey Athletic Center. The first set of members was inducted in 2004.

See also
 Military World Games
 List of college athletic programs in New York#Division I
 United States Military Academy grounds and facilities#Athletic facilities
 List of sportspeople educated at the United States Military Academy

Footnotes

External links